The 1960 Campeonato Paulista da Divisão Especial, organized by the Federação Paulista de Futebol, was the 59th season of São Paulo's top professional football league. Santos won the title for the 5th time. América, Corinthians de Presidente Prudente and Ponte Preta were relegated and the top scorer was Santos's Pelé with 34 goals.

Championship
The championship was disputed in a double-round robin system, with the team with the most points winning the title and the team with the fewest points being relegated. Aside of that, the three teams directly above the last-placed team would dispute a playoff to define the other two relegation berths.

Playouts

Top Scores

References

Campeonato Paulista seasons
Paulista